NGC 3656 is a peculiar galaxy formed by the collision of two galaxies in the constellation of Ursa Major. It is located about 135 million light years away from Earth, which means, given its apparent dimensions, that NGC 3656 is approximately 70,000 light years across. It was discovered by William Herschel on April 14, 1789.

Characteristics 
NGC 3656 is a galaxy merger, created by the collision of two disk galaxies. The merger has created shells around the galaxy and two faint tidal tails. The first tail emanates from a position angle of 260° and after bends to the north-northwest. Its total extent is about 180 arcseconds, towards a dwarf galaxy, and maybe even more, towards a second dwarf galaxy. Its width is 15 arcseconds. The other tail lies at the north-northeast part of the galaxy and is not as well defined as the other. Other characteristics of the galaxy include the presence of a condensation at the south part of the galaxy connected with the rest of the galaxy with a ring-like feature and is associated with a bright shell.

The inner part of the disk features more intense star formation.

The nucleus of NGC 3656 has been found to rotate around an axis that is almost perpendicular to the rotation axis of the rest of the galaxy, which is another indication of a galaxy merger.

Supernovae 
Two supernovae have been observed in the galaxy, SN 1963K, with a peak apparent magnitude of 15, and SN 1973C, with a peak apparent magnitude of 17. Both supernovae were not specified as far as their type was concerned.

Nearby galaxies 
NGC 3656 is the foremost member in a galaxy group known as the NGC 3656 group. Another member is UGC 6422. A bit further away lies the galaxy NGC 3549 with its group.

References

External links 

NGC 3656 on SIMBAD

Irregular galaxies
Ring galaxies
Peculiar galaxies
Interacting galaxies
Ursa Major (constellation)
Discoveries by William Herschel
Astronomical objects discovered in 1789
3656
06403
34989
155